Bergen is a municipality and a town in the Netherlands, in the province of North Holland. Its North Sea beaches and forests make it a popular destination for tourists. In 2001, the municipality was formed from a merger of the former municipalities of Egmond, Schoorl, and the smaller community of Bergen proper that had existed since 1811.

Since about 1900, Bergen has been the home of many painters, writers and architects. Some of the work of this "Bergen School" is on exhibit at Museum Kranenburgh. The neighbourhood of Park Meerwijk, constructed in 1915, is made up entirely of villas in Amsterdam School style. There are regular art fairs in Bergen, as well as an annual music festival (the Holland Music Sessions in August) and arts festival (the Kunsttiendaagse in October).

Other points of interest in the municipality include the aquarium in the seaside village of Bergen aan Zee, the Auto Union Museum in Bergen with a collection of classic cars, and the historical museums Het Sterkenhuis (Bergen) and Museum van Egmond (Egmond aan Zee).

The town of Bergen has been home to the European School, Bergen, since 1963. In July 2021, the decision was made to move the school to Alkmaar.

Population centres

The municipality of Bergen consists of the following towns, villages and/or districts: Bergen, Aagtdorp, Bergen aan Zee, Bregtdorp, Camperduin, Catrijp, Egmond aan den Hoef, Egmond aan Zee, Egmond-Binnen, Groet, Hargen, Rinnegom, Schoorl, Schoorldam (partly), Wimmenum.

History

The Egmond Abbey, founded in the 10th century, became the most important cultural center of medieval Holland. The abbey was protected by the House of Egmond, which eventually became a powerful noble family. The three towns of Egmond have been mentioned since the 10th century as well. Both the Egmond Abbey and Egmond Castle in Egmond aan den Hoef were destroyed in 1573 on order of William the Silent during the Dutch Revolt.

The town of Bergen developed around a chapel and is mentioned as far back as the tenth century as well. An old local legend is the "Miracle of Bergen", which is said to have occurred during the St. Elisabeth's Flood of 1421. The story goes that the schout (sheriff) of Bergen found a chest containing hosts (the thin wafers used in Holy Communion) from the church of Petten which had floated to Bergen during the flood. The seawater that penetrated the chest had turned into blood. There is also a second miracle story, thought to have occurred in 1422, whereby hosts turned into blood. On the site where the miracle of Bergen is said to have happened, a chapel was erected. Bergen became a place of pilgrimage, and Roman-Catholic processions were held at the site for centuries and are still ongoing today.

In the fifteenth century, the Ruïnekerk ("Ruined Church") was built on the site of the chapel and at the time was the largest of its kind in the province of North Holland. In 1574, during the Eighty Years War against Spain, the church was looted and burned down by Dutch Protestants, but was later rebuilt to its current state.

In 1797, the Battle of Camperdown, a major naval action between the British and Batavian (Dutch) fleets, was fought off the coast of Camperduin, part of the municipality of Bergen. It was the most significant action between British and Dutch forces during the French Revolutionary Wars and resulted in a complete victory for the British, who captured 11 Dutch ships without losing any of their own. And in 1799, a British-Russian army invaded North-Holland. At Bergen, a battle with the French-Batavian armies took place on 19 September. The Russisch Monument in Bergen commemorates this Battle of Bergen.

Bergen was one of the main stations on the narrow-gauge railway between Alkmaar and Bergen aan Zee, which ran between 1905 and 1955. One of the locomotives which operated on this line, 'Bello' stood for many years in the town centre as a memorial, and is now preserved at the Museumstoomtram Hoorn - Medemblik.

Local government 
The municipal council of Bergen consists of 23 seats, which are divided as follows:

 VVD - 3 seats
 CDA - 3 seats
 Gem Bel B.E.S. - 3 seats
 PvdA - 2 seats
 D66 - 3 seats
 GroenLinks - 3 seats
 KIES Lokaal - 6 seats

Notable people 

 Saint Adalbert of Egmond (died ca. 710 in Egmond), Northumbrian Anglo-Saxon missionary
 Egmond family (1310 - 1574), one of the principal noble families of the County of Holland
 Arnold, Duke of Guelders  (1410 in Egmond-Binnen – 1473), Duke of Guelders and Count of Zutphen
 Jan van Scorel (1495 in Schoorl – 1562), Dutch painter
 Pierre Gole (1620 in Bergen - 1684), cabinetmaker and designer
 Adriaan Roland Holst (1888 – 1976 in Bergen), writer and poet, lived in Bergen from 1918 
 Charley Toorop (1891 – 1955 in Bergen), painter and lithographer, lived in Bergen from 1932 
 Edgar Fernhout (1912 in Bergen - 1974), Dutch painter
 Simeon ten Holt (1923 in Bergen – 2012), Dutch contemporary classical composer
 Saskia Weishut-Snapper (born 1938) a Dutch fiber artist, grew up in Bergen
 Elly de Waard (born 1940 in Bergen), poet and music reviewer
 Adriaan van Dis (born 1946 in Bergen aan Zee), Dutch author
 Thé Lau (1952 in Bergen - 2015), Dutch musician and writer
 Saskia Noort (born 1967 in Bergen), Dutch crime-writer and freelance journalist
 Jan Roos (born 1977 in Bergen), journalist and politician
 Jim Bakkum (born 1987 in Egmond-Binnen), singer, actor, and TV personality 
Maan de Steenwinkel (born 1997 in Bergen), singer, winner of The Voice of Holland

Sport 
 Gerard du Prie (1937 in Egmond aan Zee – 2020), strongman and powerlifter
 Marja Wokke (born 1957 in Bergen), former marathon runner
 Kees van Wonderen (born 1969 in Bergen), retired Dutch footballer with 358 club caps
 Teun de Nooijer (born 1976 in Egmond aan den Hoef), field hockey play and multiple Olympic team medalist
 Martina Wegman (born 1989 in Schoorl), Dutch slalom canoeist

Gallery

References

External links

Official website

 
Municipalities of North Holland
Populated places in North Holland